

Peaks

Pamir-Alay
 Pamir Mountains
 Academy of Sciences Range
 Ismoil Somoni Peak
 Peak Korzhenevskaya  (Ozodi)
 Mount Garmo
 Rushan Range
 Patkhor Peak
 Shakhdara Range
 Mayakovskiy Peak
 Karl Marx Peak
 Trans-Alay Range
 Ibn Sina Peak (Lenin)
 Yazgulem Range
 Independence Peak (Revolution)
Peter I Range
Moscow Peak
 Gissar Range
Khazret Sultan
 Shughnon Range
Pik Skalisty
 Alay Mountains
 Fann Mountains
 Zeravshan Range
Chimtarga Peak
 Concord Peak

Tian Shan
 Turkestan Range
 Vakhsh Range

Tajikistan
Mountains
Tajikistan